Giorgi Kvirikashvili (born 20 July 1967) is a Georgian politician who was Prime Minister of Georgia from 30 December 2015 to 13 June 2018. Prior to that he was Minister of Economy and Sustainable Development from 25 October 2012 until 1 September 2015, Minister of Foreign Affairs from 1 September 2015 until 30 December 2015, and Deputy Prime Minister from 26 July 2013 until 30 December 2015. Kvirikashvili has led initiatives to advance Euro-Atlantic and European integration and highlight Georgia as an attractive location for foreign investment.  

On 20 June 2018, Mamuka Bakhtadze, who previously served as Kvirikashvili's Minister of Finance, was approved by the Georgian Parliament to succeed Kvirikashvili in a 99-6 vote.

Education 
Born in Tbilisi, Kvirikashvili went through the compulsory military service in the Soviet army from 1986 to 1988. He graduated from the Tbilisi State Medical University with a degree in Internal Medicine in 1991 and then from the Tbilisi State University with a degree in Economics in 1995. In 1998, he obtained a master's degree in finances from the University of Illinois.

Career 

Kvirikashvili worked as an executive for various banks in Georgia from 1993 to 1999 and as a deputy head of fiscal and monetary office at the State Chancellery of the President of Georgia in 1999. On Same year, kvirikashvili joined president Eduard Shevardnadze's Ruling Party, Union of Citizens of Georgia (UCG) and became member of parliament.  In 2000, with other 9 MPs kvirikashvili split from ruling UCG and founded new party named New Rights Party. After the Rose Revolution swept Mikheil Saakashvili to the presidency of Georgia, Kvirikashvili returned to his businesses. From 2006 to 2011, he was Director General of Cartu Bank, owned by the multi-billionaire tycoon  Bidzina Ivanishvili. With Ivanishvili's coming in politics and the victory of his Georgian Dream coalition over Saakashvili's United National Movement in the October 2012 parliamentary election, Kvirikashvili was appointed Minister of Economy and Sustainable Development of Georgia in the cabinet of Bidzina Ivanishvili in October 2012. He additionally assumed the office of Vice Prime Minister in July 2013. He retained both these positions in the succeeding cabinet of Irakli Garibashvili, Ivanishvili's choice as his successor, in November 2013.

In December 2015, Kviriashvili was nominated by the Georgian Dream coalition as new Prime Minister after Irakli Garibashvili announced his resignation. Kvirikashvili and his incoming cabinet won the confidence vote in the Parliament with 86 votes to 28 on December 30, 2015. Kvirikashvili's government was focused on growing the economy and promoting entrepreneurship. One of the major reforms under his premiership was the so-called Estonian Tax model, which taxes a company's pay-out dividends but not its profits, in 2018. Kvirikashvili has said that he would like to make Georgian–American relations "a backbone of regional stability, economic development, and democratization."

Links 
 Official Youtube Channel

References 

|-

|-

Prime Ministers of Georgia
Businesspeople from Tbilisi
1967 births
Living people
Georgian Dream politicians
Government ministers of Georgia (country)
Foreign Ministers of Georgia
Members of the Parliament of Georgia
Politicians from Tbilisi
Tbilisi State Medical University alumni
Tbilisi State University alumni
University of Illinois alumni
21st-century politicians from Georgia (country)